{{DISPLAYTITLE:Fructose 5-dehydrogenase (NADP+)}}

In enzymology, a fructose 5-dehydrogenase (NADP+) is an enzyme that catalyzes the chemical reaction

D-fructose + NADP+  5-dehydro-D-fructose + NADPH + H+

Thus, the two substrates of this enzyme are D-fructose and NADP+, whereas its 3 products are 5-dehydro-D-fructose, NADPH, and H+.

This enzyme belongs to the family of oxidoreductases, specifically those acting on the CH-OH group of donor with NAD+ or NADP+ as acceptor. The systematic name of this enzyme class is D-fructose:NADP+ 5-oxidoreductase. Other names in common use include 5-ketofructose reductase (NADP+), 5-keto-D-fructose reductase (NADP+), fructose 5-(nicotinamide adenine dinucleotide phosphate), dehydrogenase, D-(-)fructose:(NADP+) 5-oxidoreductase, and fructose 5-dehydrogenase (NADP+).

References

 
 

EC 1.1.1
NADPH-dependent enzymes
Enzymes of unknown structure